Ixion is a king punished by the gods in Greek mythology.

Ixion may also refer to:

Music
Ixion, a 1699 opera by Nicolaus Adam Strungk
"Ixion", a 1986 single by Blyth Power
"Ixion", a song by L.E.D. used in Beatmania IIDX 22: Pendual
"Ixion", a 2008 song by Misanthrope from IrremeDIABLE

Vehicles
Ford Ixion or Mazda Premacy, a minivan
Ixion, a steam locomotive in the South Devon Railway Comet class
Ixion, a preserved British Rail Class 46 diesel locomotive

Video games
Ixion (1983 video game), an Atari 2600 prototype game by Sega
Ixion (2022 video game), a management game by Bulwark Studios
Ixion, a fictional train in Dark Chronicle
Ixion, a fictional jet from Raiden Fighters Jet
Ixion, a fictional summonable Aeon from Final Fantasy X
Ixion, a fictional boss in Returnal

Other uses
 28978 Ixion, a minor planet in the Solar System
 Ixion (coral), a junior synonym for Ezziona, a genus of soft corals
 Ixion (Ribera), a 1632 painting by Jusepe de Ribera
Basil H. Davies or Ixion (1879–1961), clergyman who wrote for The Motor Cycle
 Ixion, or the Man at the Wheel, an 1863 burlesque by F. C. Burnand
 Ixion, a 1952 poetry collection by Shake Keane
 Ixion, a project by NanoRacks to turn spent rocket tanks into habitable living area